No. 119 Squadron RAF was a squadron of the Royal Air Force, flying with RAF Coastal Command during the Second World War. It was the only RAF unit flying the Short G class and Short C class flying boats.

History

Formation in World War I
No. 119 Squadron was originally formed on 1 January 1918 at RAF Andover to become a day bomber unit. It flew various aircraft, including Airco DH.4s and Airco DH.9s in the working up period spent at RAF Duxford and later RAF Thetford, but failed to become operational and was disbanded at RAF Wyton on 6 December of the same year.

Reformation in World War II

On Flying boats
The squadron was reformed from 'G' flight at RAF Bowmore, Strathclyde on 13 March 1941, as part of No. 15 Group of Coastal Command. The unit was equipped with the three Short G class and two Short C class (Clio and Cordelia) flying boats, re-equipping with the Catalina Mk.Ib in June 1941. The squadron deployed to RAF Pembroke Dock on 4 August, becoming non-operational there for lack of serviceable aircraft until they moved to RAF Lough Erne on 19 April 1942, where they re-equipped with the Catalina Mk.IIIa the next month. In August they returned to Pembroke Dock, changing to Sunderland Mks.II and IIIs in September. The squadron was disbanded on 17 April 1943 at Pembroke Dock.

On biplanes

On 19 July 1944 however, 119 Squadron was reformed by redesignation of a flight of No. 415 Squadron RCAF at RAF Manston, equipped with Albacore Mk.Is, taking over the aircraft as well as the squadron code, 'NH' (till this moment the aircraft of no. 119 sqn had only carried single-letter individual aircraft codes). They deployed to RAF Swingfield and (very briefly) RAF Beccles before being based at RAF Bircham Newton in September, flying anti-shipping patrols and hunting for German E-boats and R-boats. In October 1944 detachments of the squadron were sent to B.65/Maldeghem, B.63/St. Croix and B.83/Knocke-Le Zoute in Belgium and added German midget-submarines to its prey. In January 1945 they re-equipped with the ASV-equipped Swordfish Mk.III which aided in the hunt on midget-submarines, destroying three before their final mission was flown on 8 May 1945. The squadron disbanded at Bircham Newton on 25 May 1945.

One of the Swordfish flown by the squadron, Swordfish Mk.III, NF370 is preserved and displayed at the Imperial War Museum Duxford, painted in its original 119 Squadron markings.

Aircraft operated

References

Notes

Bibliography

 Bowyer, Michael J.F. and John D.R. Rawlings. Squadron Codes, 1937-56. Cambridge, UK: Patrick Stephens Ltd., 1979. .
 Flintham, Vic and Andrew Thomas. Combat Codes: A full explanation and listing of British, Commonwealth and Allied air force unit codes since 1938. Shrewsbury, Shropshire, UK: Airlife Publishing Ltd., 2003. .
 Halley, James J. The Squadrons of the Royal Air Force & Commonwealth 1918-1988. Tonbridge, Kent, UK: Air Britain (Historians) Ltd., 1988. .
 Jefford, C.G. RAF Squadrons, a Comprehensive record of the Movement and Equipment of all RAF Squadrons and their Antecedents since 1912. Shrewsbury, Shropshire, UK: Airlife Publishing, 1988 (second edition 2001). .
 Rawlings, John D.R. Coastal, Support and Special Squadrons of the RAF and their Aircraft. London: Jane's Publishing Company Ltd., 1982. .
 Thomas, Andrew. "Light Blue 'Stringbags':The Fairey Swordfish in RAF Service". Air Enthusiast, No. 78, November/December 1998. Stamford, UK:Key Publishing. ISSN 0143-5450. pp. 73–77.

External links

 No. 119 Squadron RAF movement and equipment history
 RAF site of No. 119 Squadron

119 Squadron
119 Squadron